William Francis Walsh (July 11, 1912 – January 8, 2011) was a Republican-Conservative member of the United States House of Representatives from New York State.

Biography
Walsh was born in Syracuse, New York to Irish immigrant parents. He graduated from St. Bonaventure's College, now St. Bonaventure University, in 1934. He received a master's degree in social work from the University at Buffalo in 1949, and an honorary doctorate in civil law from St. Bonaventure University in 1970. He served in the United States Army Air Forces from 1941 to 1946, first as a private, and later being honorably discharged as a captain.

Walsh worked in social services, including serving as a field representative for the New York State Commission Against Discrimination. He was appointed Welfare Commissioner of Onondaga County in New York State in 1959.  He was elected mayor of Syracuse in 1961, and served until 1969. He became more nationally-known by serving as Vice President of the US Conference of Mayors.  He was a delegate to the 1968 Republican National Convention. He was elected to Congress in 1972, and served from January 3, 1973 until January 3, 1979.

Honors in memory

At St. Bonaventure University in St. Bonaventure, New York, the William F. Walsh Science Center was named in his honor in 2006 and dedicated in 2008.  The Center was built as a result of $10 million in federal monies secured for its construction with the assistance of former United States Congress Member James T. Walsh, William's son, who is also a Republican.

Personal life
Walsh was married to Mary Dorsey Walsh, and had seven children, all of whom pursued careers in public service.  Walsh's children, Bill Walsh and Martha Hood Walsh are judges in Onondaga County, and James T. Walsh served in Congress for twenty years. His grandson Ben Walsh became Syracuse mayor in 2018.

References

External links

1912 births
2011 deaths
American people of Irish descent
University at Buffalo alumni
United States Army Air Forces officers
Mayors of Syracuse, New York
St. Bonaventure University alumni
Military personnel from Syracuse, New York
Republican Party members of the United States House of Representatives from New York (state)
20th-century American politicians